Nationality words link to articles with information on the nation's poetry or literature (for instance, Irish or France).

Events
Robert Burns is appointed an exciseman in Scotland.
Tomás António Gonzaga is arrested for complicity in the Inconfidência Mineira in Brazil.

Works published

Ireland
 Charlotte Brooke, Reliques of Irish Poetry, anthology published in the United Kingdom
 John Williams, publishing under the pen name "Anthony Pasquin", Poems: by Anthon Pasquin, Irish poet and satirist published in the United Kingdom

United Kingdom
 William Blake:
 The Book of Thel, with eight relief-etched plates
 Songs of Innocence, the author's first illuminated book, with 31 relief-etched plates (see also Songs of Innocence and of Experience: Shewing the Two Contrary States of the Human Soul 1794); Songs of Innocence contains the following (some, as noted below, were later "paired" with a poem having the same title in Songs of Experience):
 Introduction
 "The Shepherd"
 "The Ecchoing Green"
 "The Little Black Boy"
 "The Blossom"
 "Laughing Song"
 "A Cradle Song"
 "Night"
 "Spring"
 "A Dream"
 "On Another's Sorrow"
 "Nurse's Song" (paired)
 "Infant Joy" (paired)
 "The Lamb" (paired)
 "Holy Thursday" (paired)
 "Holy Thursday" (paired)
 "The Chimney Sweeper" (paired)
 "The Little Boy lost" (paired)
 "The Little Boy Found" (paired)
 "The Divine Image" (paired)
 "The Little Girl Lost" (paired)
 "The Little Girl Found" (paired)
 "The Tyger" (paired)
 "The Human Abstract" (paired)
 "Infant Sorrow" (paired)
 William Lisle Bowles, Fourteen Sonnets
 Charlotte Brooke, Reliques of Irish Poetry, anthology
 Thomas Cary, Abram's Plains, a long poem, the first English poetry published in Canada; private printing in Quebec
 Erasmus Darwin, The Loves of the Plants, the work proved popular and was republished in 1791 as the second part of The Botanic Garden
 John Ogilvie, The Fane of the Druids
 Thomas Russell, Sonnets and Miscellaneous Poems
 John Williams, publishing under the pen name "Anthony Pasquin", Poems: by Anthony Pasquin, Anglo-Irish poet and satirist published in the United Kingdom
 Mary Wollstonecraft, writing under the pen name "Mr. Cresswick", The Female Reader: Or, Miscellaneous Pieces, in Prose and Verse; selected from the best writers, and disposed under proper heads; for the improvement of young women. By Mr. Cresswick, teacher of elocution. To which is prefixed a preface, containing some hints on female education, London: Joseph Johnson, prose and poetry anthology

Other
 Jens Baggesen, Holger the Dane, a poem in which the author ridiculed the author's fellow Danes and expressed the wish of becoming a German; the author left Denmark for Germany as a result of the poem; published in the Spring; Denmark
 Elijah Fitch, the Beauties of Religion. A Poem, Addressed to Youth, United States
 Philip Phile, "The President's March", composed for the inauguration of George Washington, later retitled Hail, Columbia and arranged with lyrics by Joseph Hopkinson in 1798, when it stirred patriotic feelings in the United States at a time when war with France seemed imminent, United States
 Elizabeth Scott, "Awake, our drowsy souls", a Christian hymn which was popular in the US and the UK, passing into several hymnals and undergoing various changes

Births
Death years link to the corresponding "[year] in poetry" article:
 January 5 – Thomas Pringle (died 1834), Scottish writer, poet and abolitionist
 March 18 – Charlotte Elliott (died 1871), English poet and hymn writer
 May 28 – Bernhard Severin Ingemann (died 1862), Danish poet, playwright and historical novelist
 August 17 – William Knox (died 1825), Scottish poet and journalist
 September 24 – Richard Henry Wilde (died 1847), Irish-born American lawyer, politician and poet

Deaths
Birth years link to the corresponding "[year] in poetry" article:
 January 23 – Frances Brooke (born 1724), English novelist, poet, essayist, playwright and translator
 July 30 – Frances Greville (born 1724/7), probably-Irish-born English poet
 October 19 – Lucretia Wilhelmina van Merken (born 1721), Dutch poet and playwright
 November 16 – Konrad Arnold Schmid (born 1716), German writer and philologist
 Hedvig Löfwenskiöld (born 1736), Swedish poet

See also

Poetry

Notes

18th-century poetry
Poetry